Nembrotha yonowae is a species of colourful sea slug, a dorid nudibranch, a marine gastropod mollusk in the family Polyceridae. It was first described in 1992.

Distribution
This species is known from the western Indo-Pacific Ocean, including the Maldives, the Philippines and Indonesia.

Description
Nembrotha yonowae is a large black nembrothid that grows to at least 95 mm in length. Its body is covered with orange pustules. The rhinophores and gills are black, edged in orange. This species looks similar in appearance to Nembrotha cristata.

Ecology
Nembrotha yonowae eats colonial ascidians.

References

External links
 http://www.nudipixel.net/species/nembrotha_yonowae/ Nembrotha yonowae at nudipixel

Polyceridae
Gastropods described in 1992